Prince Gustav may refer to:
 Gustav of Sweden (1568–1607), son of Eric XIV
 Gustav, Prince of Vasa (1799–1877), son of Gustav IV Adolf of Sweden
 Prince Gustaf, Duke of Uppland (1827–1852), son of Oscar I of Sweden
 Prince Gustav of Denmark (1887–1944), son of Frederick VIII
 Prince Gustav of Thurn and Taxis (1888–1919)
 Gustav, 7th Prince of Sayn-Wittgenstein-Berleburg, (born 1969)